Luciano Theiler (born 1 June 1981) is an Argentine football manager and former player who played as a defender.

Club career
Theiler started his senior career with Club Atlético Belgrano in the Primera B Nacional, where he made nine league appearances and scored zero goals. After that, he played for Alumni de Villa María, General Paz Juniors, Independiente de La Rioja, Club San José, Club Atlético Patronato, Victory Sports Club, Al-Karamah SC, Al Ahed, Persiba Bantul, Muktijoddha Sangsad KC, and Talleres de Perico before retiring.

References

External links 

1981 births
Living people
Argentine footballers
Association football defenders
Argentine expatriate footballers
Expatriate footballers in Bolivia
Expatriate footballers in the Maldives
Expatriate footballers in Lebanon
Expatriate footballers in Bangladesh
Argentine expatriate sportspeople in Bolivia
Argentine expatriate sportspeople in the Maldives
Argentine expatriate sportspeople in Lebanon
Argentine expatriate sportspeople in Bangladesh
Club Atlético Belgrano footballers
Alumni de Villa María players
General Paz Juniors footballers
Club San José players
Club Atlético Patronato footballers
Victory Sports Club players
Al-Karamah players
Al Ahed FC players
Muktijoddha Sangsad KC players
Lebanese Premier League players
Argentine football managers
Independiente Rivadavia managers
Argentine expatriate football managers
Expatriate football managers in Paraguay
Argentine expatriate sportspeople in Paraguay
Club General Caballero (Juan León Mallorquín) managers